George W. Ewell (October 29, 1850 – October 20, 1910) was an American professional baseball player.

Ewell was born and died in Philadelphia, Pennsylvania, and is interred at Mount Moriah Cemetery.

References

External links

1850 births
1910 deaths
Burials at Mount Moriah Cemetery (Philadelphia)
Major League Baseball right fielders
Cleveland Forest Citys players
19th-century baseball players
Baseball players from Philadelphia